Lye By Mistake were an American experimental metal band from St. Louis, Missouri, United States, that formed in 2004.  They released their most recent album, Fea Jur, on October 13, 2009.  They blend many genres into their music, including progressive rock, jazz fusion, and mathcore. After seven years as a musical project, the members went their separate ways in 2011. By late 2012, the band's dissolution was confirmed by both former vocalist Tony Saputo and former drummer Drew Button, although no official breakup announcement was ever made.

History
After they formed, they self-produced and released a five track EP, "The Fabulous" in 2004.

In May 2006, they released their debut album "Arrangements For Fulminating Vective" on Lambgoat Records. The album was mixed by Eric Rachel and mastered by Alan Douches.

In June 2008, vocalist Tony Saputo left the band. The band intended to find another vocalist, but decided to continue for their second album as an instrumental band.  In October 2009, "Fea Jur" was released as their sophomore effort on the record label Black Market Activities.

The band's name comes from Edward Gorey's book of the illustrated alphabet, in which J is for James who took lye by mistake.

Members
Josh Bauman - guitar
Drew Button - drums/percussion
Bob-e Rite - guitar
Johnnie Truesdale - bass

Former members
Tony Saputo - vocals

Michael Krueger - drums

Michael Nelson - bass

Discography

Albums
Arrangements for Fulminating Vective (Lambgoat Records, 2006)
Fea Jur (Black Market Activities, 2009)

EPs
The Fabulous (Independent, 2004)

References

External links
Official Myspace Page
Metal Blade Records page
Black Market Activities page

Black Market Activities artists
Musical groups established in 2004